The End of the Beginning is the first studio album by Irish post-rock band God Is an Astronaut.

Its name is most likely from a famous quote by British war-leader and Prime Minister Winston Churchill, in a speech about the Second Battle of El Alamein: "Now this is not the end, it is not even the beginning of the end. But it is, perhaps, the end of the beginning."

"Fall from the Stars" was used during TV3's coverage of the 2007 Rugby World Cup.

The album was digitally remastered and re-released in 2011.

Track listing

References

2002 debut albums
Revive Records albums
God Is an Astronaut albums